Against The Grain, Acoustic Alchemy's 8th album, was released on 11 October 1994 under the GRP label.

Despite having only ten tracks, Against the Grain manages to notch up a total play time of 53 minutes because of the band's experimentation with some longer, more drawn out tracks.

The most successful effort from this release was "Lazeez", one of two tracks from this album to appear on the compilation album, "The Very Best Of Acoustic Alchemy" (2002).

Track listing

Personnel 

Nick Webb - Steel String Guitar, 12 String
Greg Carmichael - Nylon String Guitar
Iain McArthur - Programming, Keys (Tracks 1 & 6)
Rainer Bruninghaus - Piano, Keys (Track 3)
John Parsons - Dobro (Track 1,7), Electric Guitar
Paul Harriman - Bass
Bert Smaak - Drums
Luis Jardim - Percussion
Phil Todd - Tenor Sax, Soprano Sax, Flute
Terry Disley - Keys (Track 4,9)
Jerry Douglas - Dobro (Track 5)
Mike Herting - Keys (Track 7)

References

Acoustic Alchemy albums
GRP Records albums
1994 albums